Kévin Vauquelin (born 26 April 2001) is a French cyclist, who currently rides for UCI WorldTeam .

Major results

Road

2018
 1st  Time trial, National Junior Championships
 4th Chrono des Nations Juniors
 4th La Classique des Alpes Juniors
2019
 National Junior Championships
1st  Road race
3rd Time trial
 6th Overall Grand Prix Rüebliland
 6th La Classique des Alpes Juniors
2020
 2nd Trio Normand
 3rd Time trial, National Under-23 Championships
2021
 1st  Time trial, National Under-23 Championships
 2nd Overall Etoile d'Or
 3rd Annemasse–Bellegarde et retour
 9th Overall Tour d'Eure-et-Loir
2022
 1st  Young rider classification, Tour of Belgium
 2nd Overall Tour Poitou-Charentes en Nouvelle-Aquitaine
1st  Young rider classification
 2nd Overall Tour de Luxembourg
 4th Route Adélie
 6th Overall Tour of Oman
 6th Overall Arctic Race of Norway
 7th Overall Vuelta a Asturias
 7th Time trial, UEC European Championships
 7th Ronde van Drenthe
2023
 1st  Overall Tour des Alpes-Maritimes et du Var
1st  Young rider classification
1st Stage 1
 4th Overall Étoile de Bessèges

Track

2018
 2nd  Team pursuit, UCI World Junior Championships
2019
 UCI World Cup
1st Team pursuit, Milton
3rd Madison (with Morgan Kneisky), Brisbane
 UCI World Junior Championships
2nd  Points race
2nd  Team pursuit
3rd  Madison (with Clément Petit)

References

External links

2001 births
Living people
French male cyclists
People from Bayeux
Cyclists from Normandy
Sportspeople from Calvados (department)